Chamaemyia taiwanensis is a species of fly in the family Chamaemyiidae. It is found in Taiwan and is the only known representative of its genus there.

Taxonomy
The type series was collected from Hehuanshan (Mount Hehuan, also romanized as Hohuanshan) in Nantou County in July 1990 and September 1999. The types were found in the unsorted material of the Taichung Museum and subsequently described as a new species in 2005 by László Papp.

Habitat
Most of the types were collected with sweeping net.

Description
The halteres are whitish yellow. The antennae, arista, and tibiae are black; the first flagellomere of the antennae can seldom be very narrowly dirty yellow. The abdomen has large black spots. The clypeus is narrow and black, while the proboscis is yellow.

References

Chamaemyiidae
Diptera of Asia
Insects of Taiwan
Endemic fauna of Taiwan
Insects described in 2005